The 2018 Formula One Esports Series was the second season of the Formula One Esports Series. It started on October 10, 2018 and ended on November 17, 2018. It was held on Formula One's official 2018 game. The championship was held at Gfinity Arena in London, United Kingdom. Brendon Leigh defended his Drivers' Championship title, while his team Mercedes-AMG Petronas Esports clinched its first championship title.

Format 

 Qualification - The season opens with online qualification, a global call for participation. Qualification is open to anyone with a copy of the official Formula 1 video game developed by Codemasters. The fastest gamers get through.
 Pro Draft - Qualifying gamers enter the Pro Draft where the official Formula 1 teams select their drivers to represent them in the F1 Esports Pro Series championships.
 Pro Series - The drivers race in 25-50% races over a series of events that are broadcast live. They earn points for themselves and their F1 teams. These races will determine the  F1 New Balance Esports Series Teams’ and Drivers’ World Champions, with a portion of the prize fund distributed to the teams based on their standings.

Teams and drivers

Calendar

Results

Season summary

Championship standings

Scoring system 

Same as 2018 Formula One World Championship, points are awarded to the top ten classified drivers in every race, using the following system:

In the event of a tie at the conclusion of the championship, a count-back system is used as a tie-breaker, with a driver's/constructor's best result used to decide the standings.

Drivers' Championship standings 

Note:
 – Double points were awarded in the last race at the Yas Marina Circuit, Abu Dhabi.

Teams' Championship standings 

Notes:
 – Double points were awarded in the last race at the Yas Marina Circuit, Abu Dhabi.
The standings are sorted by best result, rows are not related to the drivers. In case of tie on points, the best positions achieved determined the outcome.

References

External links 
 

Formula One Esports Series
Esports
2018 in esports